Pride Divide is a 1997 documentary film directed by Paris Poirier. It examines the issues within the LGBT community relating to apparent divisions between lesbians and gay men.

Participants
Joan Jett Blakk
Kate Clinton
Martin Duberman
Lillian Faderman
Barbara Gittings
Michael Goff
Harry Hay
Simon LeVay
JoAnn Loulan
Michael Musto
Joan Nestle
Ann Northropp
Camille Paglia
Sarah Pettit
Catherine Saalfield
Sarah Schulman
Michelangelo Signorile
Rose Troche

Reception
Pride Divide won the aGLIFF Award at the 1997 Austin Gay & Lesbian International Film Festival. In 1999, it won the Gold Apple award from the National Educational Media Network. Writing for Variety, Ken Eisner called the film brave and entertaining.

References

External links
Official site
 
 

1997 films
1997 LGBT-related films
Documentary films about LGBT topics
American documentary films
American LGBT-related films
1997 documentary films
1990s English-language films
1990s American films